Etna is former railroad station in Lincoln County, in the U.S. state of Nevada.

In 1941, Etna had 14 inhabitants.

Etna Cave, which contains rock art, is located nearby.

The site is of Etna is just north of the present day Narconon Rainbow Canyon Retreat on Nevada State Route 317.

References

Ghost towns in Lincoln County, Nevada